Why Not is the debut studio album from Taiwanese Mandopop artist Ella Chen of girl group S.H.E. It was released on 17 April 2015 by HIM International Music.

The tracks "Love Addiction" (信愛成癮) and "Wasted Tears" (浪費眼淚) are listed at number 36 and 73 respectively on Hit FM's Annual Top 100 Singles Chart for 2015.

Track listing

Concerts

Music Videos

References

Ella Chen albums
2015 debut albums
HIM International Music albums